Pieter de Zwart (16 March 1944, Utrecht) is a sailor from the Netherlands, who represented his country at the 1968 Summer Olympics in Acapulco. De Zwart, as crew on the Dutch Dragon, took 10th place with helmsman Cor Groot and fellow crew member Jan Bol.

Sources
 
 
 
 
 
 
 
 
 
 
 

Living people
1944 births
Dutch male sailors (sport)
Olympic sailors of the Netherlands
Sailors at the 1968 Summer Olympics – Dragon
Sportspeople from Utrecht (city)